Demographic research may refer to 

 Demography, a field of study
 Demographic Research (journal)